The 2013–14 season is Ludogorets Razgrad's second season in A Football Group, of which they are defending Champions. They will also take part in the Bulgarian Cup, SuperCup and enter the UEFA Champions League at the second qualifying round stage.

Squad

Transfers

Summer

In:

Out:

Winter

In:

Out:

Competitions

Supercup

A PFG

First phase

Table

Results summary

Results by round

Results

Championship group

Table

Results summary

Results by round

Results

Bulgarian Cup

Final

Champions League

Qualifying stage

Europa League

Group stage

Knockout phase

Notes

Squad statistics

Appearances and goals

|-
|colspan="14"|Players who appeared for Ludogorets Razgrad that left during the season:

|}

Scorers

Disciplinary record

Club

Coaching staff

Kit

|
|
|
|
|

Other information

References

Ludogorets Razgrad
PFC Ludogorets Razgrad seasons
Bulgarian football championship-winning seasons